The 2001 Armenian First League season started on 15 May and ended on November 10. FC Malatia from Yerevan became the league champions, and were promoted to the 2002 Armenian Premier League.

Overview
 FC Malatia and FC Kasakh returned to professional football.
 Armavir FC returned to professional football under the name Karmrakhayt.
 FC Gyumri changed their name back to Aragats FC.
 Newly created Pyunik-2 joined the league.

Participating clubs

League table

First stage

Second stage
 Teams kept head-to-head results of preliminary stage in both groups.
 Tavush withdrew before the start of the second stage

Championship group

Bottom group

Top goalscorers

See also
 2001 Armenian Premier League
 2001 Armenian Cup
 2001 in Armenian football

References

External links
 RSSSF: Armenia 2001 - Second Level

 

Armenian First League seasons
2
Armenia